Anoplophora medenbachii (often misspelled medembachi) is a species of beetles in the family Cerambycidae. It is distributed in Southeast Asia (Borneo, Sumatra, Malaysia, Thailand).

References

External links 
 

Lamiini
Beetles described in 1881
Beetles of Asia